Regina Petrey Bunch (born October 3, 1962) is an American Republican politician and educator who is a member of the Kentucky House of Representatives.

Bunch was a special education teacher in the middle school and lives in Williamsburg, Kentucky. In 2011, she was elected to the Kentucky House of Representatives in a special election succeeding her husband Dewayne Bunch who was fatally injured while breaking up a student fight at the high school where he had taught.

Notes

1962 births
Living people
People from Whitley County, Kentucky
Educators from Kentucky
Kentucky women in education
Republican Party members of the Kentucky House of Representatives
Women state legislators in Kentucky
21st-century American politicians
21st-century American women politicians